The Bishop of Kerry is the Ordinary of the Roman Catholic Diocese of Kerry, one of the suffragan dioceses of the Archdiocese of Cashel and Emly in Ireland.

The Episcopal see changed its name from Ardfert and Aghadoe to Kerry on 20 December 1952. The bishop's seat (Cathedra) is located at the Cathedral Church Saint Mary, Killarney.

The current bishop is the Most Reverend Raymond Browne who was appointed Bishop of Kerry by Pope Francis on 2 May 2013 and received episcopal consecration at St Mary's Cathedral, Killarney on 21 July 2013.

List of Bishops of Kerry

References

Kerry
Religion in County Kerry
Roman Catholic Diocese of Kerry
Bishops of Limerick or Ardfert or of Aghadoe
Roman Catholic bishops of Kerry